The End of Violence is a 1997 drama film by the German director Wim Wenders. The film's cast includes Bill Pullman, Andie MacDowell, Gabriel Byrne, Traci Lind, Rosalind Chao, and Loren Dean, among others. It also features a soundtrack marked with the signature sounds of Wenders regulars Jon Hassell, Ry Cooder, and Bono. The film was praised by a select few critics for its cinematography, but performed poorly in the box office. It was entered into the 1997 Cannes Film Festival.

The movie had a budget of $5 million, but only received $386,673 in its domestic box office.

Like many other of Wenders' American movies, the film was shot in multiple locations, for instance the Griffith Observatory in Griffith Park and the Santa Monica Pier.

A scene in the film shows a live recreation of the painting Nighthawks by Edward Hopper.

Synopsis
Movie producer Mike Max meditates on the paranoia of fear of attack, in the movie business and life in general, as his wife Paige announces she is leaving him. He receives a document via email from a NASA employee he met earlier at a conference. Before opening it he is kidnapped and almost killed, a scene captured by surveillance cameras and witnessed by computer scientist Ray Bering on  surveillance footage scene in his laboratory at the Griffith Observatory.  However, it soon turns out the two men have been shot, Max has escaped and now is accused of killing them. He takes shelter with, and goes to work for, the Mexican gardeners who find him and they help him investigate who is trying to kill him and why. Bering, who originally sent Max the email and recognized Max in the surveillance footage, has a conversation with an intelligence agent who makes it clear that anyone who gets in the way of a new “anti-crime” satellite surveillance program not yet approved by Congress will be dealt with terminally. Detective Dean Brock suspects Max is not a killer and on a tip meets with Bering, who is assassinated by a gunshot as they begin to speak. Max gives up his business and money to his wife and the movie ends as he meditates on how a real attack has freed him from paranoia.

Cast
 Traci Lind as Cat
 Rosalind Chao as Claire
 Bill Pullman as Mike Max
 Andie MacDowell as Paige Stockard
 K. Todd Freeman as Six O One
 Gabriel Byrne as Ray Bering
 Chris Douridas as Technician
 Pruitt Taylor Vince as Frank Cray
 John Diehl as Lowell Lewis
 Soledad St. Hilaire as Anita
 Nicole Ari Parker as Ade (as Nicole Parker)
 Daniel Benzali as Brice Phelps
 Samuel Fuller as Louis Bering (as Sam Fuller)
 Loren Dean as Detective Dean Brock
 Marshall Bell as Sheriff Call
 Frederic Forrest as Ranger MacDermot
 Marisol Padilla Sánchez as Mathilda
 Michael Massee as Guy in the bar
 Kerry Rossall as Featured Performer

Reception
The End of Violence received some negative reviews from critics. It holds a 29% rating on Rotten Tomatoes based on 34 reviews. 
Writing in Time Out New York, Andrew Johnston (critic) observed: "Many of Wenders's best films have been road movies and Violence qualifies as one thanks to all the time the characters spend on L.A.'s freeways. Like Robert Altman's Short Cuts (which it resembles in a lot of ways), it cleverly exploits its Southern California locale and offers a truly challenging analysis of American life."

See also

 List of films featuring surveillance

References

External links

1997 films
Films directed by Wim Wenders
1997 drama films
American drama films
Films scored by Ry Cooder
Films about security and surveillance
Films set in the United States
Metro-Goldwyn-Mayer films
1990s English-language films
1990s American films